Greater Manchester, a metropolitan county in North West England, has a public rail network of 130 route miles (209 km) and 92 National Rail stations. Transport for Greater Manchester is responsible for specifying fares and service levels of train services operating in the county. The Northern train operating company provides most of these services. The four main railway stations in Manchester city centre are Manchester Piccadilly, Manchester Victoria, Manchester Oxford Road and Manchester Deansgate which all form part of the Manchester station group.

Most services run to or through one of Manchester city centre's major stations, Manchester Victoria and Manchester Piccadilly. The network is effectively divided into two operating halves based on these stations, although the opening of a connecting line in 1988 improved operational flexibility by joining the north and south halves. This was further improved by the Ordsall Chord (opened to traffic on 10 December 2017), creating a direct link between Piccadilly and Victoria. 

Services radiate northwards from Manchester Victoria, providing stopping services to West Yorkshire and Liverpool as well as local suburban services to Rochdale and Wigan. The south side's services radiate from Manchester Piccadilly and run to Manchester Airport, south Manchester, Cheshire, Staffordshire, Leeds, North East England, London and other major destinations.

The region's rail network started to develop during the Industrial Revolution, when it was at the centre of a textile manufacturing boom. Manchester was at the forefront of the railway building revolution during the Victorian era.  The world's first passenger railway, the Liverpool and Manchester Railway, opened on 15 September 1830. Its original terminus, Liverpool Road railway station, was closed to passengers in 1844, but still exists and is the oldest surviving passenger station in the world. Since the Beeching cuts many of Greater Manchester's stations have closed and many station facilities have been removed. Others, however, have been converted to the Manchester Metrolink, Greater Manchester's light-rail network, or preserved as part of the East Lancashire Railway heritage route. The expansion of the Metrolink is set to continue at least through 2020, with the planned opening of the Trafford Park Line. In October 2009, nine stations on the former Oldham Loop Line closed for conversion, and future plans include the use of tram-trains to allow Metrolink to serve existing National Rail stations.

In preparation for the 2002 Commonwealth Games Manchester Piccadilly, the principal station for the City of Manchester, was extensively redeveloped and as a consequence has been voted as having the highest customer satisfaction rating of all the main stations in the United Kingdom. As of 2013, Manchester Victoria is under renovation with the construction of a new £20 million roof while Oxford Road will see redevelopment as a result of the Northern Hub plan in 2014. The construction of the Ordsall Chord linked Greater Manchester's three busiest stations for the first time in December 2017.

Railway stations currently in use

See also
 List of closed railway stations in Greater Manchester
 Transport in Manchester

Footnotes
 The total of 98 given at www.gmpte.com excludes Reddish South and Denton, which have one service per week, but includes Dean Lane, Failsworth, Hollinwood, Oldham Werneth, Oldham Mumps, Derker, Shaw and Crompton, New Hey and Milnrow, which closed on 3 October 2009.
 Of the stations on the East Lancashire Railway operational as of the 2015 season, three (Bury Bolton Street, Heywood and Summerseat) are located within Greater Manchester.
 Two other platforms are used by Manchester Metrolink services.
 Originally opened in 1839 and closed in 1842.  Reopened 25 March 1985 on the same site.
 One other platform is used by Metrolink services.

References

Greater Manchester
Greater Manchester